The Delhi Golf Club (DGC) is a prominent golf club situated in Delhi, India. It has ultra restrictive membership, with well over a waiting period of over 50 years for prospective members. It is close to Delhi's top tourist sites of India Gate, Humayun's Tomb, Delhi Zoo, and Lodhi Gardens.  DGC comprises 18-hole course designed by the Gary Player Design studio, which is part of the Asian PGA Tour, and a shorter 9-hole course,  and sprawling club house with swimming pool.

History
The original course, called the Lodhi Golf Club, laid out in the 1930s by the then Chief of the Horticultural Department, was much larger than the present walled area, and included parts of present Golf Links and Kaka Nagar. The Lodhi Golf Club, however, had few members, and was barely sustainable, except for a brief period during the Second World War when Delhi was awash with Allied officers who patronized the club. In 1948, the club had eighty members, and in 1951, when it became the Delhi Golf Club (DGC), its membership was no more than 120, and was barely sustainable. The Club was saved from dissolution by Indian officers belonging to the Indian Civil Service, including Dharma Vira, founder member of the DGC,  who petitioned Prime Minister Nehru to lease the government land to the club at a low annual rent for thirty years. Since that time, the Government of India has favored the DGC with very permissive lease terms and low annual rents that have no relationship to the actual value of the land. The DGC has evolved as a favorite watering hole for senior Civil Servants, Police Officers and the business and social elite.   The walled area of the club includes a large number of interesting Mughal archeological remains such as the famous Lal Bangla.

Course
The course comprises the championship 18-hole "Lodhi Course", which is part of the Asian PGA Tour, and the shorter 9-hole "Peacock Course". The latter came into being when the course was re-designed by Peter Thomson in 1976–77. The DGC hosts various tournaments and cups, such as the Indian Open. In 2019 the Gary Player Design firm completely redesigned the golf course.

Subsidy
The Delhi Golf Club has an area of 220 acres. The DGC club house, including the course, is on government land. In 2012, eight years before the lease was due for renewal, Kamal Nath, the Minister of Urban Development in the United Progressive Alliance government,  approved extension of the lease until 2050.

Management committee
The DGC management committee consists of a President, a Course Captain and twelve general committee members, excluding government nominated members. Posts on the management committee are filled through election. These are usually held in September.

President

Maj. Ravinder Singh Bedi (Retd) has been appointed as president for 2019–2020.

Captain

Mr. Rohit Sabherwal, FCA has been appointed as captain for 2019–2020.

Club amenities

The DGC has a large bungalow style club house with extensive lawns, gazebos, several indoor and outdoor bars, restaurants, a gym, a sauna, a pro shop and a large parking designated area.

Air quality
The DGC, despite its many acres, has not escaped Delhi's poor air quality. In the evening illumination, as well as the early morning sun, "the shroud of carcinogenic particles hovering above the bunkers and greens" are very visible.

Allegations of racism and elitism 
In June 2017, a woman named Tailin Lyngdoh, a Khasi, had gone to the Club along with her employer Nivedita Barthakur after they were invited for lunch by a member of the Club. However, 15–20 minutes into the lunch, two Club officials asked Lyngdoh to leave the table saying the dress (Jainsem) she was wearing was a "maid's uniform" which looked like a "dustbin" and also allegedly hurled racial abuse at her. This incident was widely covered in the Indian media condemning the classism attitude of the Delhi Golf Club and elite clubs of India in general.

See also
 Delhi Gymkhana
 India Habitat Centre
 List of golf courses in Delhi NCR

Notes

External links

 Delhi Golf Club – official site
 Jobs at Delhi Golf Club

Golf clubs and courses in India
Sport in New Delhi
1950 establishments in India